Arjanak (also Romanized as Arjanak; also known as Arjang) is a village in Poshtkuh Rural District, in the Central District of Khansar County, Isfahan Province, Iran. At the 2006 census, its population was 1,149, in 317 families.

References 

Populated places in Khansar County